Cnemaspis retigalensis,  also known as the Retigala day gecko, is a species of diurnal gecko endemic to island of Sri Lanka.

References

 http://reptile-database.reptarium.cz/species?genus=Cnemaspis&species=retigalensis
 http://animaldiversity.ummz.umich.edu/accounts/Cnemaspis_retigalensis/classification/

retigalensis
Reptiles of Sri Lanka
Reptiles described in 2007